"Floating" is a song by American rapper Schoolboy Q featuring Atlanta-based rapper 21 Savage from the former's fifth studio album Crash Talk (2019). It was sent to rhythmic contemporary radio on June 11, 2019, as the album's third single. The song was produced by Cardo and Johnny Juliano.

Music video 
The music video was uploaded onto Schoolboy Q's Vevo channel on YouTube on May 15, 2019. It was directed by Jack Berget and Dave Free. In it, Schoolboy Q takes the audience on a tour to Los Angeles, and stop motion effect is used throughout the visual. 21 Savage does not appear in the video.

Charts

Certifications

References 

2019 songs
2019 singles
Schoolboy Q songs
21 Savage songs
Songs written by Schoolboy Q
Songs written by 21 Savage
Songs written by Cardo (record producer)
Songs written by Kendrick Lamar
Top Dawg Entertainment singles
Interscope Records singles
Song recordings produced by Cardo (record producer)